James Bowie (1796–1836) was an American pioneer, fighter and frontiersman.

James Bowie may also refer to:

James Bowie (footballer) (1888–1972), Scottish footballer
James Bowie (botanist) (1789–1869), English botanist
Jim Bowie (baseball) (born 1965), American baseball first baseman
Jimmy Bowie (1924–2000), Scottish footballer
James Bowie (lawyer), Canadian lawyer

See also
James Bowie High School (disambiguation)